The history of shopping malls in Michigan began in 1954. That year, the Hudson's department store chain and architect Victor Gruen developed Northland Center in the Detroit suburb of Southfield. It was followed by three other directional malls in Detroit suburbs, also developed by Hudson's and Gruen: Eastland Center in Harper Woods, Westland Center in Westland and Southland Center in Taylor. The first enclosed mall in Michigan was Rogers Plaza in Wyoming, which opened in August 1961. Beyond these, Michigan includes more than 50 other malls.

Shopping malls by region

Northern Michigan

Metro Detroit and Southeast Michigan

Central Michigan

Flint - Tri-cities

Western Michigan

Upper Peninsula

Other outlet centers
Birch Run Premium Outlets — Birch Run
Holland Town Center — Holland
Lansing Factory Outlet Stores — Dewitt
Monroe Outlet Center — Monroe
Port Huron Factory Shops — Port Huron
Tanger Factory Outlets — Howell
Tanger Factory Outlets — West Branch
Tanger Factory Outlets — Grand Rapids

Redeveloped or abandoned
Birchwood Mall - Kingsford
Brighton Mall - Brighton
Bloomfield Park - Pontiac
Centerpointe Mall — Grand Rapids
Cherryland Mall (now Cherryland Center) - Traverse City
Fort Saginaw Mall - Saginaw
Gull Crossing - Kalamazoo
Hampton Square Mall - Essexville
M & M Plaza - Menominee
Maple Hill Mall - Kalamazoo
 Marquette Mall — Marquette
Mineral River Plaza - White Pine
Muskegon Mall — Muskegon
North Kent Mall — Grand Rapids
Northland Center - Southfield
Southland Shopping Center - Portage
Summit Place Mall - Waterford Township
Traverse City Premium Outlets - Garfield Township
Universal Mall - Warren (1965–present)
West Main Mall - Kalamazoo
Winchester Mall - Rochester Hills

References

Michigan
 
Shopping malls